Jarosław Kukowski (born 11 April 1972 in Tczew) is a Polish contemporary painter, juror of international art competitions (including The World's Greatest Erotic Art of Today). His works were exhibited, among others Branch Museum of the National-Królikarnia Salons Rempex Auction House, the Museum of Galicia, the Contemporary Art Gallery, Castle Voergaard, the Art Expo New York and many other galleries and museums in the world. He is considered one of the most influential contemporary creators of the Surrealist circle.

Information on his work
In the early period of his work, the atmosphere of his works, considered symbolic, is saturated with drama and sadness. Painful deformed human figures and mythical creatures are shown against a surreal background landscapes. This series of works was defined by the author as non-dreams. In the next period Kukowski definitely brightened his palette. The dominant theme of his paintings became nudes, but even here the mark of disintegration and the passage of time is felt. These works have been painted in the form of frescoes destroyed by time and revealing completely different images under them. In the next phase of the work, Kukowski referred to his first works, but despite his lighter tones his paintings became more and more ironic and provocative.

The artist also cooperates with musicians and avant-garde artists. His works are used for illustrative forms related to contemporary music (he collaborates with the Theater of Creation and the alternative formation of Peter Murphy - Dali's Car - a record - "InGladAloneness".

The most important work cycles

Painting cycles

 "Dreams"
 "Non-dreams"
 "Frescoes"
 "Golden series"

Installations
 "Memento" is a combination of sculpture, painting and monumental clocks. The cycle "Memento" is a development of the painter's series "Frescos" realized by the creator in the 90s. The clocks were displayed in many galleries and museums (among others, Zachęta, and in the Diocesan Museum in Pelplin).

He is also the creator of animations documenting the creative process of his paintings.

Works in public space
 Diocesan Museum in Pelplin (two objects from the "Memento" series)
 Museum of Julian Ochorowicz in Wisła
 Mural at Armii Krajowej Street in Tczew

Exhibitions and displays

 2018 – Muzeum w Grudziądzu, Poland
 2018 – Galeria Miejska, Wrocław, Poland
 2018 – Europejskie Centrum Sztuki w Białymstoku, Opera i Filharmonia Podlaska, Białystok, Poland
 2018 – Dreamscapes Exhibition, Traun, Austria
 2018 – NCK Ratusz Staromiejski, Gdańsk, Poland
 2018 – Wejherowskie Centrum Kultury, Filharmonia Kaszubska, Wejherowo, Poland
 2017 – ZACHĘTA Narodowa Galeria Sztuki, Warsaw, Poland
 2017 – Galeria Quantum, Warsaw, Poland
 2017 – NCK Ratusz Staromiejski, Gdańsk, Poland
 2017 – Galeria Sztuki Współczesnej, Włocławek, Poland
 2016 – Muzeum Miasta Gdańsk – Ratusz, Gdańsk, Poland
 2016 – Filharmonia Podkarpacka im. Artura Malawskiego, Rzeszów, Poland
 2016 – Galeria Sztuki Współczesnej BWA, Katowice, Poland
 2016 – Centrum Promocji Kultury Praga, Warsaw, Poland
 2016 – Galeria Miejska, Wrocław, Poland
 2016 – Galeria PRO ARTE, Zielona Góra, Poland
 2016 – Hopfenmuseum, Wolnzach, Germany
 2015 – ZACHĘTA Narodowa Galeria Sztuki, Warsaw, Poland
 2015 – Fabryka Sztuk, Tczew, Poland
 2015 – Muzeum Miejskie Wrocławia, Wrocław, Poland
 2015 – Bator Art Gallery, Szczyrk, Poland
 2015 – „Geysers of Subconsciousness” Kaługa, Russia
 2015 – Galeria Quantum, Warsaw, Poland
 2014 – Muzeum Historyczne Miasta Gdańsk, Gdańsk, Poland
 2014 – Galeria Sztuki Współczesnej BWA w Katowicach, Poland
 2014 – Millenium Hall w Rzeszowie, Poland
 2014 – Dom Artysty Plastyka, Warsaw, Poland
 2014 – Muzeum Diecezjalne, Pelplin, Poland
 2014 – V.A. Gallery Poland, Poznań, Poland
 2013 – ZACHĘTA Narodowa Galeria Sztuki Warszawa, Poland
 2013 – Muzeum Miejskie we Wrocławiu, Poland
 2013 – Galeria Sztuki Współczesnej, Kołobrzeg, Poland
 2012 – Millenium Hall, Rzeszów, Poland
 2012 – Galeria Sztuki Współczesnej, Kołobrzeg, Poland
 2012 – MOK, Gniezno, Poland
 2012 – Beskidzka Galeria Sztuki, Szczyrk, Poland
 2012 – Galeria Sztuki Współczesnej, Włocławek, Poland
 2012 – Galeria Sztuki Współczesnej BWA, Katowice, Poland
 2012 – „Geysers of Subconsciousness 8” Moscow, Russia
 2011 – Muzeum Miejskie Wrocławia, Wrocław, Poland
 2011 – ZACHĘTA Narodowa Galeria Sztuki, Warsaw, Poland
 2010 – California Modern Art Gallery, San Francisco, USA
 2009 – Płocka Galeria Sztuki, "Widzialne Niewidzialne", Płock, Poland
 2009 – Galeria ZPAP, Łódź, Poland
 2009 – WSC Miami, USA
 2009 – BOXeight Studios & Gallery, Los Angeles, USA
 2008 – „Polish Surrealists”, SD Panorama Patio Gallery, Warsaw, Poland
 2008 – World Art Erotic Art Museum, Miami USA
 2008 – Beate Ushe Erotik Museum, Berlin, Niemcy
 2008 – Wynwood Art District Miami, USA
 2008 – Conseil des Arts du Quebec, Montreal, Canada
 2008 – SOHO Studios Miami, USA
 2007 – SD Wilanów Gallery, Warsaw, Poland
 2007 – Modern Art Gallery, Kołobrzeg, Poland
 2005 – Voregaard Castle, Dania
 2005 – Galeria Sztuki Współczesnej, Kołobrzeg, Poland
 2005 – The Turlej Foundation Gallery, Kraków, Poland
 2004 – Program Gallery: exhibition presenting finalists, Warsaw, Poland
 2004 – Galerie Bram, Denmark
 2004 – Exhibition in the gallery of ” REMPEX” Auction House, Warsaw, Poland
 2004 – BP Gallery, Warsaw, Poland
 2004 – Nationwide Antiquarianism and Contemporary Art Fairs, Kraków, Poland
 2004 – SD Wilanów Gallery, Warsaw, Poland
 2003 – SD Wilanów Gallery, Warsaw, Poland
 2003 – exhibition in the rooms of ” REMPEX” Auction House, Warsaw, Poland
 2003 – Ars Nova Gallery, Łódź, Poland
 2003 – The National Museum of Art „Painting of the Year 2002”, Warsaw, Poland
 2003 – „Nude” exhibition, Gallery of „REMPEX” Auction House, Warsaw, Poland
 2003 – Nationwide Antiquarianism and Contemporary Art Fairs, Kraków, Poland
 2002 – ”Polish Surrealists” exhibition, Panorama Patio Gallery, Warsaw, Poland
 2002 – The National Museum, the Królikarnia Palace, Warsaw, Poland
 2002 – ARTEXPO, New York, USA
 2001 – Nationwide Antiquarianism and Contemporary Art Fairs, Kraków, Poland
 2000 – SD Wilanów Gallery, Warsaw, Poland
 1999 – Wilczeniec, Warsaw, Poland
 1999 – Muzeum Diecezjalne, Pelplin, Poland
 1998 – Wilczeniec, Warsaw, Poland
 1998 – Adi Art Gallery, Łódź, Poland
 1997 – Teatr “Miniatura”, Gdańsk, Poland
 1996 – SD Wilanów Gallery, Warsaw, Poland
 1994 – “CSW Stara Łaźnia” Galeria, Gdańsk, Poland
 1994 – “N” Gallery, Starogard Gdański, Poland
 1994 – Castle of Knights of the Order of St. John of Jerusalem, Poland
 1994 – Galeria “Plama” Gdańsk, Poland
 1993 – Bruwssum, Denmark

References

External links
 Official website
 A blog in Polish about painting and selected painters
 Video documentation of the exhibition at ZPAP
 Clocks in the cycle of Jarosław Kukowski
 Website dedicated to contemporary Polish painters
 J. Kukowski's works in the photo gallery of Polish painters
 Artist's works on the website of the painting exhibition on the 100th anniversary of regaining independence by Poland

1972 births
20th-century Polish painters
20th-century Polish male artists
21st-century Polish painters
21st-century male artists
Living people
People from Tczew
Polish designers
Polish speculative fiction artists
Polish male painters